Igor Vladimirovich Belkovich (Игорь Владимирович Белькович) (October 15, 1904 (OS: October 2) – May 30, 1949) was a Soviet astronomer.

His son Oleg Igorevich Belkovich was also an astronomer.

The crater Belkovich on the Moon is named after him.

External links
  Biography by his son

Soviet astronomers
1904 births
1949 deaths